KHOK is a radio station airing a country music format licensed to Hoisington, Kansas, broadcasting on 100.7 MHz FM.  The station serves the Great Bend, Kansas area, is owned by Eagle Communications, Inc.

References

External links

Country radio stations in the United States
HOK